The Bdellovibrionaceae are a family of Pseudomonadota. They include genera, such as Bdellovibrio and Vampirovibrio, which are unusual parasites that enter other bacteria.

References

See also
 List of bacterial orders
 List of bacteria genera

External links
 Bdellovibrionaceae - J.P. Euzéby: List of Prokaryotic names with Standing in Nomenclature

Oligoflexia